Creaserinus burrisi, the burrowing bog crayfish, is a species of crayfish in the family Cambaridae. It is found in a limited range in southeastern Mississippi and southwestern Alabama.

The IUCN conservation status of Creaserinus burrisi is "DD", data deficient, risk undetermined. This status was last reviewed in 2010.

References

Further reading

 
 
 

Cambaridae
Crustaceans described in 1987
Taxa named by Joseph F. Fitzpatrick Jr.
Taxobox binomials not recognized by IUCN